Sister Mary is a 2011 American musical comedy film directed and written by Scott Grenke and starring Ant, James Vallo, Bruce Vilanch, Judy Tenuta, Sean Paul Lockhart and Shawn Quinlan.

Plot
Homophobic detective Mark Rima must "partner" up with flamboyant gay detective Chris Riant to stop a serial-killing nun from killing five members of a band called The Ex Choir Boys. When it is determined that the detectives cannot solve the case on their own, expert FBI profiler Agent Peccant is assigned to the case. As the details of the case slowly emerge the police determine that the "nun" may only be a silent witness to the grisly murders. The task force then turns its attention on the Catholic Church and a suspect group of priests with a propensity for "cleansing the souls" of innocent young choir boys.

Cast
 Ant as Agent Peccant
 James Vallo as Mark Rima
 Bruce Vilanch as Farmer Jake
 Judy Tenuta as Older Nun
 Sean Paul Lockhart as Chad
 Shawn Quinlan as Chris Riant
 Matthew Feeney as Chief Homer Bathos
 Anthony Fagiano as Joel Davidson
 James Pusztay as Father O'Bleary
 Miss Foozie as herself
 Z.D. Smith as Ray
 Suzy Brack as Tranny McTrannerson
 Michelle Shields as Detective Emma Sharp
 Eddie Huchro as Father Perdu
 Erin Muir as Elecktra Le Strange

Production
The film is produced by Knee Deep Films, company headed by James Vallo. The film was shot in Chicago, Illinois.

Reception
Chris Carpenter said, "Scott Grenke has a lot for which to atone. The movie isn't so much anti-Catholic as it is criminally unfunny".

Awards and nominations

Soundtrack
"Knights of the Altar" — Bob Rysavy, Brandon McCauley and Anthony Fischer
"Sacrements" — Anthony Fischer, Brandon McCauley and Bob Rysavy
"Blessed" — Brandon McCauley, Bob Rysavy and Anthony Fischer
"Pillars" — Bob Rysavy, Anthony Fischer and Brandon McCauley
"Falling" — Anthony Fischer, Brandon McCauley and Bob Rysavy
"Disposable" — Brandon McCauley, Bob Rysavy and Anthony Fischer
"Nothing Yet" — Tim Feeney

References

External links
 
 

2011 films
2011 comedy films
2011 LGBT-related films
2010s musical comedy films
2010s serial killer films
American LGBT-related films
American musical comedy films
American serial killer films
Films about Catholic nuns
LGBT-related musical comedy films
2010s English-language films
2010s American films